The 1985 NCAA Division I baseball season, play of college baseball in the United States organized by the National Collegiate Athletic Association (NCAA) began in the spring of 1985.  The season progressed through the regular season and concluded with the 1985 College World Series.  The College World Series, held for the thirty-ninth time in 1985, consisted of one team from each of eight regional competitions and was held in Omaha, Nebraska, at Johnny Rosenblatt Stadium as a double-elimination tournament.  Miami (FL) claimed the championship for the second time.

Realignment and format changes
Nicholls State and Northwestern State departed the Trans America Athletic Conference for the Gulf Star Conference and Southland Conference, respectively.
The Big South Conference formed, consisting of 8 teams from NCAA Division I, NCAA Division II, and NAIA, and petitioned for Division I status.  This was granted in 1986.  The members were Armstrong State, Augusta State, Baptist, Campbell, Coastal Carolina, Radford, UNC Asheville, and Winthrop.
The Association of Mid-Continent Universities instituted division for conference play.  The Blue Division consisted of Cleveland State, UIC, and Valparaiso while the Gray Division included Eastern Illinois, Northern Iowa, Southwest Missouri State, and Western Illinois.

Conference winners
This is a partial list of conference champions from the 1985 season.  The NCAA sponsored regional competitions to determine the College World Series participants.  Five regionals of four teams and three of six each competed in double-elimination tournaments, with the winners advancing to Omaha.  25 teams earned automatic bids by winning their conference championship while 13 teams earned at-large selections.

Conference standings
The following is an incomplete list of conference standings:

College World Series

The 1985 season marked the thirty ninth NCAA Baseball Tournament, which culminated with the eight team College World Series.  The College World Series was held in Omaha, Nebraska.  The eight teams played a double-elimination format, with Miami (FL) claiming their second championship with a 10–6 win over Texas in the final.

Award winners

All-America team

References